Clay Township is a township in Butler County, Kansas, USA.  As of the 2000 census, its population was 83.

History
Clay Township was created in 1879.

Geography
According to the United States Geological Survey, it contains two cemeteries: Bryant and Lone Star.

The stream of North Branch Rock Creek runs through this township.

Further reading

References

 USGS Geographic Names Information System (GNIS)

External links
 City-Data.com

Townships in Butler County, Kansas
Townships in Kansas